The PEACE method of investigative interviewing is a five stage process in which investigators try to build rapport and allow a criminal suspect to provide their account of events uninterrupted, before presenting the suspect with any evidence of inconsistencies or contradictions. It is used to obtain a full account of events from a suspect rather than just seeking a confession - which is the goal of the Reid technique, in which interrogators are more aggressive, accusative, and threatening in terms of proposing consequences for the suspect's failure to confess to the crime.

The PEACE method, which "encourages more of a dialogue between investigator and suspect" was developed in Britain in response to the realisation that psychologically coercive techniques often led to false confessions. In 2015, the Royal Canadian Mounted Police adopted a new standard influenced by the PEACE model. Sergeant Darren Carr, who trains police with the new approach, described it as "less Kojak and more Dr. Phil". There is some resistance to adopting the PEACE model in Canada. This approach avoids the use of deceptive information to overwhelm suspects. It emphasizes information gathering over eliciting confessions and discourages investigators from presuming a suspect's guilt.

Stages

Planning and preparation 
This requires investigators to find out as much as they can about the incident under investigation, including who needs to be interviewed and why.

Engage and Explain 
The purpose of this stage is to establish rapport and is described in the literature as the most influential aspect in whether or not an interview is successful. It involves showing concern for the subject's welfare by asking how they want to be addressed, how much time they've got available to be interviewed and giving reassurance if the person seems anxious or nervous.

Account — Clarification and challenge 
This stage is where interviewer attempts to obtain a full account of events from the subject without interrupting. Once the subject has explained what happened, the interviewer can ask follow up questions which allow them to expand and clarify their account of events. If necessary this may involve challenging aspects of the interviewee's story if contradictory information is available.

Closure 
This stage involves summarizing the subject's account of what happened and is designed to ensure there is mutual understanding between interviewer and interviewee about what has taken place. It also involves verifying that everything that needs to be discussed has been covered.

Evaluation 
This stage requires the interviewer to examine whether they achieved what they wanted from the interview; to review the status of the investigation in the light of any new information that was received; and to reflect upon how well the interview went and what, if anything, could have been done differently.

Effectiveness 
How well the PEACE method works appears to depend primarily on how well trained the interviewers are. In a study published in the British Psychological Society related to benefit fraud, 63% of (non-police) interviewers who displayed an acceptable level of competence in their interviewing ability obtained comprehensive accounts or full confessions from subjects. Even when subjects denied any offending, these interviewers still obtained a comprehensive account of what happened. This reaffirmed the importance of eliciting and fully testing the suspects’ accounts of events. In the same study, 92% of interviewers who did not display competence in their interviewing technique failed to obtain a comprehensive account of events or a confession from their subjects.

However, skill and training are not the only factors at play. Half the suspects in this study confessed even though the interviewers' skills were considered less than satisfactory. This suggests that "some suspects enter the interview room having decided to confess and will carry out this decision irrespective of the investigator’s performance".

In addition to investigations into benefit fraud, several studies have noted that training the police in the PEACE model has also produced beneficial results.

International adoption 

As of November 2017, the PEACE method has been adopted by police forces in Australia, New Zealand, Norway, and parts of Canada. Vietnam and Indonesia were also considering using this approach.

References

Criminal justice
Interrogation techniques